Lučica  is a village in Karlovac County in municipality of Barilović, central Croatia. 

Populated places in Karlovac County

References